Tõnu Tõniste (born 26 April 1967) is Estonian Olympic sailor. He competed in four consecutive Summer Olympics, starting in 1988, winning a silver and a bronze medal in the men's 470 class, for the Soviet Union (silver, 1988) and for Estonia (bronze, 1992). He did so with his twin brother Toomas Tõniste. Now he is sailing in team Lenny in the Melges 24 class.

References

External links 
 Melges 24 Hall of Fame, Corinthian Melges 24 European Champions by Year, melges24.com
 2011 Aarhus, Denmark Tõnu Tõniste (EST)
 2014 Balatonfüred, Hungary Tõnu Tõniste (EST)
 
 
 
 

1967 births
Living people
Sportspeople from Tallinn
Estonian male sailors (sport)
Soviet male sailors (sport)
Estonian twins
Olympic sailors of the Soviet Union
Olympic sailors of Estonia
Sailors at the 1988 Summer Olympics – 470
Sailors at the 1992 Summer Olympics – 470
Sailors at the 1996 Summer Olympics – 470
Sailors at the 2000 Summer Olympics – 470
Olympic silver medalists for the Soviet Union
Olympic bronze medalists for Estonia
Olympic medalists in sailing
Twin sportspeople
Medalists at the 1992 Summer Olympics
Medalists at the 1988 Summer Olympics